
Gmina Karczmiska is a rural gmina (administrative district) in Opole Lubelskie County, Lublin Voivodeship, in eastern Poland.

Villages
Gmina Karczmiska contains the villages and settlements of Bielsko, Chodlik, Głusko Duże-Kolonia, Głusko Małe, Górki, Jaworce, Karczmiska, Mieczysławka, Noworąblów, Słotwiny, Uściąż, Uściąż-Kolonia, Wolica, Wolica-Kolonia, Wymysłów, Zaborze and Zagajdzie.

Neighbouring gminas
Gmina Karczmiska is bordered by the gminas of Kazimierz Dolny, Łaziska, Opole Lubelskie, Poniatowa, Wąwolnica and Wilków.

References

 Polish official population figures 2006

Karczmiska
Opole Lubelskie County